JSC (Joint Stock Company) Transmash is a Russian rail industry company specialising in rolling stock, track laying equipment, and railway snow ploughs. 

Transmash is owned by Integrirovannaya Vagonostroitelnaya Kompaniya (part of the Transmashholding group); the Slovak Tatravagonka company owns a 50% stake in the plant.

History
The company was founded in 1898 as Engels transport machine manufacturing factory., in 1956 the factory started the production of snowploughs; both self-propelled and non-self-propelled. In 1996 the factory became a joint stock company and started the production of railway track maintenance equipment rolling stock, such as wagons for switches and ballast. In 2004 the company started production of wagons for container transportation.

Specializes in domestic brake production. The company mainly specializes in brake equipment for types of freight and passenger carriages, locomotives, motor coach rolling stock, high-speed and extra high-speed trains and rolling stock for underground railways.

Areas of business
The company manufactures specialised rolling stock for snow removal on railways, and other wagons for container, ballast and switches as well as carrying out overhauls on rolling stock.

References

External links
 

Rail vehicle manufacturers of Russia
Companies based in Saratov Oblast
Transmashholding
Russian brands
Cultural heritage monuments in Saratov Oblast
Objects of cultural heritage of Russia of regional significance